Gabriel Thohey Mahn-Gaby (19 September 1927 – 5 May 2016) was a Catholic archbishop.

Ordained to the priesthood in 1951, Mahn served as coadjutor archbishop of the Archdiocese of Yangon (Rangoon), Myanmar from 1964 to 1971. He then served as archbishop from 1971 to 2002. During his stay in office the name of the archdiocese was changed from Rangoon to Yangon.

See also

Notes

1927 births
2016 deaths
Burmese Roman Catholic archbishops